Subspace Explorers is a science fiction novel by American writer E. E. "Doc" Smith.  It was first published in 1965 by Canaveral Press in an edition of 1,460 copies.  The novel is an expansion of Smith's story "Subspace Survivors" which first appeared in the July 1960 issue of the magazine Astounding.

Plot introduction
It is essentially in three overlapping parts:
 A space catastrophe and its results
 The discovery and scientific study of psionics
 A war between the corrupt and shortsighted (including Labour, politicians, Soviet-style communists and greedy capitalists) and those who can see a bit further (mostly tradesmen, professionals, and businessmen).

The war is essentially an extension of the Cold War ongoing at the time of publication, extending into space, and ending with the total defeat of Communism.

Principle of enlightened self-interest

The principle of enlightened self-interest is a philosophy that has existed for hundreds of years.

In the course of the book, Doc Smith extends this principle into an economic formula used for calculating profits and bonuses.  After describing a deadly planet-wide strike, he discusses the ensuing development of this economic principle.

Later, he says:

Reception
Charles R. Tanner reviewed the novel negatively, faulting in particular its primitive political slant: "Unless one is a fanatic far-righter, he gets pretty tired of this long before he reaches the end of the book. And Doc's widely known inability to get his hero into any real trouble is made obvious again and again".

See also

 Incentivisation
 Meritocracy

References

Sources

External links
 

1965 science fiction novels
1965 American novels
American science fiction novels
Novels by E. E. Smith